Atlantis Airlines was a commuter air carrier operating turboprop aircraft in the U.S. during the 1980s providing service as Eastern Express on behalf of Eastern Air Lines.  The airline flew British Aerospace BAe Jetstream 31, de Havilland Canada DHC-6 Twin Otter and Fairchild Swearingen Metroliner turboprops as well as Piper Navajo prop aircraft in scheduled passenger operations in the southeast U.S.

In 1980 acquired Air Carolina.

See also 
 List of defunct airlines of the United States

References

Defunct airlines of the United States